The 4th Carnatic Battalion could refer to:

64th Pioneers in 1770
63rd Palamcottah Light Infantry in 1769